Resurrection or anastasis is the concept of coming back to life after death. In a number of religions, a dying-and-rising god is a deity which dies and is resurrected. Reincarnation is a similar process hypothesized by other religions, which involves the same person or deity coming back to a body, rather than the same one. Disappearance of a body is another similar, but distinct, belief in some religions.

With the advent of written records, the earliest known recurrent theme of resurrection was in Egyptian and Canaanite religions, which had cults of dying-and-rising gods such as Osiris and Baal. Ancient Greek religion generally emphasised immortality, but in the mythos a number of men and women were made physically immortal as they were resurrected from the dead.

The general resurrection of the dead is a standard eschatological belief in the Abrahamic religions. As a religious concept, it is used in two distinct respects: a belief in the resurrection of individual souls that is current and ongoing (Christian idealism, realized eschatology), or else a belief in a singular bodily resurrection of the dead at the end of the world. Some believe the soul is the actual vehicle by which people are resurrected. The death and resurrection of Jesus is a central focus of Christianity. While most Christians believe Jesus' resurrection from the dead and ascension to heaven was in a material body, some believe it was spiritual.

Like the Abrahamic religions, the Dharmic religions also include belief in resurrection and reincarnation. There are stories in Buddhism where the power of resurrection was allegedly demonstrated in Chan or Zen tradition. In Hinduism, the core belief in resurrection/reincarnation is known as saṃsāra.

Aside from religious belief, cryonics and other speculative resurrection technologies are practiced, but the resurrection of long-dead bodies is not considered possible at the current level of scientific knowledge.

Etymology
Resurrection, from the Latin noun resurrectio -onis, from the verb rego, "to make straight, rule" + preposition sub, "under", altered to subrigo and contracted to surgo, surrexi, surrectum ("to rise", "get up", "stand up") + preposition re-, "again", thus literally "a straightening from under again".

Religion

Ancient religions in the Near East

The concept of resurrection is found in the writings of some ancient non-Abrahamic religions in the Middle East. A few extant Egyptian and Canaanite writings allude to dying and rising gods such as Osiris and Baal. Sir James Frazer in his book The Golden Bough relates to these dying and rising gods, but many of his examples, according to various scholars, distort the sources. Taking a more positive position, Tryggve Mettinger argues in his recent book that the category of rise and return to life is significant for Ugaritic Baal, Melqart, Adonis, Eshmun, Osiris and Dumuzi.

Ancient Greek religion
In ancient Greek religion a number of men and women became physically immortal as they were resurrected from the dead. Asclepius was killed by Zeus, only to be resurrected and transformed into a major deity. Achilles, after being killed, was snatched from his funeral pyre by his divine mother Thetis and resurrected, brought to an immortal existence in either Leuce, the Elysian plains or the Islands of the Blessed. Memnon, who was killed by Achilles, seems to have received a similar fate. Alcmene, Castor, Heracles, and Melicertes, were also among the figures sometimes considered to have been resurrected to physical immortality. According to Herodotus's Histories, the seventh century BC sage Aristeas of Proconnesus was first found dead, after which his body disappeared from a locked room. Later he found not only to have been resurrected but to have gained immortality.

Many other figures, like a great part of those who fought in the Trojan and Theban wars, Menelaus, and the historical pugilist Cleomedes of Astupalaea, were also believed to have been made physically immortal, but without having died in the first place. Indeed, in Greek religion, immortality originally always included an eternal union of body and soul. As may be witnessed even into the Christian era, not least by the complaints of various philosophers over popular beliefs, traditional Greek believers maintained the conviction that certain individuals were resurrected from the dead and made physically immortal and that for the rest of us, we could only look forward to an existence as disembodied and dead souls.

Greek philosophers generally denied this traditional religious belief in physical immortality. Writing his Lives of Illustrious Men (Parallel Lives) in the first century, the Middle Platonic philosopher Plutarch in his chapter on Romulus gave an account of the mysterious disappearance and subsequent deification of this first king of Rome, comparing it to traditional Greek beliefs such as the resurrection and physical immortalization of Alcmene and Aristeas the Proconnesian, "for they say Aristeas died in a fuller's work-shop, and his friends coming to look for him, found his body vanished; and that some presently after, coming from abroad, said they met him traveling towards Croton". Plutarch openly scorned such beliefs held in traditional ancient Greek religion, writing, "many such improbabilities do your fabulous writers relate, deifying creatures naturally mortal."

Alcestis undergoes resurrection over a three-day period of time,
but without achieving immortality.

The parallel between these traditional beliefs and the later resurrection of Jesus was not lost on the early Christians, as Justin Martyr argued: "when we say ... Jesus Christ, our teacher, was crucified and died, and rose again, and ascended into heaven, we propose nothing different from what you believe regarding those whom you consider sons of Zeus." (1 Apol. 21).

Buddhism

There are stories in Buddhism where the power of resurrection was allegedly demonstrated in Chan or Zen tradition. One is the legend of Bodhidharma, the Indian master who brought the Ekayana school of India that subsequently became Chan Buddhism to China.

The other is the passing of Chinese Chan master Puhua (Japanese:Jinshu Fuke) and is recounted in the Record of Linji (Japanese: Rinzai Gigen). Puhua was known for his unusual behavior and teaching style so it is no wonder that he is associated with an event that breaks the usual prohibition on displaying such powers. Here is the account from Irmgard Schloegl's "The Zen Teaching of Rinzai".

Christianity
In Christianity, resurrection most critically concerns the resurrection of Jesus, but also includes the resurrection of Judgment Day known as the resurrection of the dead by those Christians who subscribe to the Nicene Creed (which is the majority or mainstream Christianity), as well as the resurrection miracles done by Jesus and the prophets of the Old Testament.

Resurrection miracles

In the New Testament, Jesus is said to have raised several persons from death. These resurrections included the daughter of Jairus shortly after death, a young man in the midst of his own funeral procession, and Lazarus of Bethany, who had been buried for four days.

During the Ministry of Jesus on earth, before his death, Jesus commissioned his Twelve Apostles to, among other things, raise the dead.

Similar resurrections are credited to the apostles and Catholic saints. In the Acts of the Apostles, Saint Peter raised a woman named Dorcas (also called Tabitha), and Paul the Apostle revived a man named Eutychus who had fallen asleep and fell from a window to his death. According to the Gospel of Matthew, after Jesus's resurrection, many of those previously dead came out of their tombs and entered Jerusalem, where they appeared to many. Following the Apostolic Age, many saints were said to resurrect the dead, as recorded in Orthodox Christian hagiographies. St Columba supposedly raised a boy from the dead in the land of Picts.

Resurrection of Jesus

Christians regard the resurrection of Jesus as the central doctrine in Christianity. Others take the incarnation of Jesus to be more central; however, it is the miracles – and particularly his resurrection – which provide validation of his incarnation. According to Paul, the entire Christian faith hinges upon the centrality of the resurrection of Jesus and the hope for a life after death. The Apostle Paul wrote in his first letter to the Corinthians:

Resurrection of the dead

Christianity started as a religious movement within 1st-century Judaism (late Second Temple Judaism), and it retains what the New Testament itself claims was the Pharisaic belief in the afterlife and resurrection of the dead. Whereas this belief was only one of many beliefs held about the world to come in Second Temple Judaism, and was notably rejected by the Sadducees, but accepted by the Pharisees (cf. Acts 23:6-8). Belief in the resurrection became dominant within Early Christianity and already in the Gospels of Luke and John, included an insistence on the resurrection of the flesh. Most modern Christian churches continue to uphold the belief that there will be a final resurrection of the dead and world to come.

Belief in the resurrection of the dead, and Jesus' role as judge, is codified in the Apostles' Creed, which is the fundamental creed of Christian baptismal faith. The Book of Revelation also makes many references about the Day of Judgment when the dead will be raised.

The emphasis on the literal resurrection of the flesh remained strong in the medieval ages, and still remains so in Orthodox churches. In modern Western Christianity, especially "from the 17th to the 19th century, the language of popular piety no longer evoked the resurrection of the soul but everlasting life. Although theological textbooks still mentioned resurrection, they dealt with it as a speculative question more than as an existential problem."

Hinduism 

There are folklore, stories, and extractions from certain holy texts that refer to resurrections. One major folklore is that of Savitri saving her husband's life from Yamraj. In the Ramayana, after Ravana was slain by Rama in a great battle between good and evil, Rama requests the king of Devas, Indra, to restore the lives of all the monkeys who died in the great battle. Mahavatar Babaji and Lahiri Mahasaya are also believed to have resurrected themselves.

Islam

Belief in the Day of Resurrection (yawm al-qiyāmah) is also crucial for Muslims. They believe the time of Qiyāmah is preordained by God but unknown to man. The trials and tribulations preceding and during the Qiyāmah are described in the Quran and the hadith, and also in the commentaries of scholars. The Quran emphasizes bodily resurrection, a break from the pre-Islamic Arabian understanding of death.

According to Nasir Khusraw (d. after 1070), an Ismaili thinker of the Fatimid era, the Resurrection (Qiyāma) will be ushered by the Lord of the Resurrection (Qāʾim al-Qiyāma), an individual symbolizing the purpose and pinnacle of creation from among the progeny of Muhammad and his Imams. Through this individual, the world will come out of darkness and ignorance and “into the light of her Lord” (Quran 39:69). His era, unlike that of the enunciators of the divine revelation (nāṭiqs) before him, is not one where God prescribes the people to work but instead one where God rewards them. Preceding the Lord of the Resurrection (Qāʾim) is his proof (ḥujjat). The Qur’anic verse stating that “the night of power (laylat al-qadr) is better than a thousand months” (Quran 97:3) is said to refer to this proof, whose knowledge is superior to that of a thousand Imams, though their rank, collectively, is one. Hakim Nasir also recognizes the successors of the Lord of the Resurrection to be his deputies (khulafāʾ).

Judaism

There are three explicit examples in the Hebrew Bible of people being resurrected from the dead:
 The prophet Elijah prays and God raises a young boy from death (1 Kings 17:17-24)
 Elisha raises the son of the Woman of Shunem (2 Kings 4:32-37) whose birth he previously foretold (2 Kings 4:8-16)
 A dead man's body that was thrown into the dead Elisha's tomb is resurrected when the body touches Elisha's bones (2 Kings 13:21)

According to Herbert C. Brichto, writing in Reform Judaism's Hebrew Union College Annual, the family tomb is the central concept in understanding biblical views of the afterlife. Brichto states that it is "not mere sentimental respect for the physical remains that is...the motivation for the practice, but rather an assumed connection between proper sepulture and the condition of happiness of the deceased in the afterlife".

According to Brichto, the early Israelites apparently believed that the graves of family, or tribe, united into one, and that this unified collectivity is to what the Biblical Hebrew term Sheol refers, the common grave of humans. Although not well defined in the Tanakh, Sheol in this view was a subterranean underworld where the souls of the dead went after the body died. The Babylonians had a similar underworld called Aralu, and the ancient Greeks had one known as Hades. According to Brichto, other biblical names for Sheol were Abaddon "ruin", found in Psalm 88:11, Job 28:22 and Proverbs 15:11;  Bor "pit", found in Isaiah 14:15, 24:22, Ezekiel 26:20; and Shakhat "corruption", found in Isaiah 38:17, Ezekiel 28:8.

During the Second Temple period, there developed a diversity of beliefs concerning the resurrection. The concept of resurrection of the physical body is found in 2 Maccabees, according to which it will happen through re-creation of the flesh. Resurrection of the dead also appears in detail in the extra-canonical Book of Enoch, 2 Baruch, and 2 Esdras. According to the British scholar in ancient Judaism Philip R. Davies, there is “little or no clear reference … either to immortality or to resurrection from the dead” in the texts of the Dead Sea Scrolls. C.D. Elledge, however, argues that some form of resurrection may be referred to in the Dead Sea texts 4Q521, Pseudo-Ezekiel, and 4QInstruction.

Both Josephus and the New Testament record that the Sadducees did not believe in an afterlife, but the sources vary on the beliefs of the Pharisees. The New Testament claims that the Pharisees believed in the resurrection, but does not specify whether this included the flesh or not. According to Josephus, who himself was a Pharisee, the Pharisees held that only the soul was immortal and the souls of good people will “pass into other bodies,” while “the souls of the wicked will suffer eternal punishment.” Paul the Apostle, who also was a Pharisee, said that at the resurrection what is "sown as a natural body is raised a spiritual body." The Book of Jubilees seems to refer to the resurrection of the soul only, or to a more general idea of an immortal soul.

Anastasis in contemporary philosophy 
Anastasis or Ana-stasis is a concept in contemporary philosophy emerging from the works of Jean-Luc Nancy, Divya Dwivedi and Shaj Mohan. Nancy developed the concept through his interpretation of paintings depicting the resurrection of Jesus Christ. Dwivedi and Mohan, referring to Nancy, defined Ana-stasis as coming over stasis, which is a method for philosophy to overcome its end as Martin Heidegger defined. This concept is noted to be linked in the works of Nancy, Dwivedi and Mohan to have a relation to Heidegger's “other beginning of philosophy”. The use of the phrase “anastasis of philosophy” indicates such other beginning.

Technological resurrection

Cryonics 
Cryonics is the low-temperature freezing (usually at ) of a human corpse or severed head, with the speculative hope that resurrection may be possible in the future. Cryonics is regarded with skepticism within the mainstream scientific community. It is generally viewed as a pseudoscience, and has been characterized as quackery.

Digital ghosts 
In his book 1988 Mind Children, roboticist Hans Moravec proposed that a future supercomputer might be able to resurrect long-dead minds from the information that still survived. For example, such can include information in the form of memories, filmstrips, social media interactions, modeled personality traits, personal favourite things, personal notes and tasks, medical records, and genetic information.

Ray Kurzweil, American inventor and futurist, believes that when his concept of singularity comes to pass, it will be possible to resurrect the dead by digital recreation. Such is one approach in the concept of digital immortality, which could be described as resurrecting deceased as "digital ghosts" or "digital avatars". In the context of knowledge management, "virtual persona" could "aid in knowledge capture, retention, distribution, access and use" and continue to learn. Issues include post-mortem privacy, and potential use of personalised digital twins and associated systems by big data firms and advertisers.

Related alternative approaches of digital immortality include gradually "replacing" neurons in the brain with advanced medical technology (such as nanobiotechnology) as a form of mind uploading (see also: wetware computer).

De-extinction 
De-extinction, enabling an organism that either resembles or is an extinct species, is also known as "resurrection biology" and often described as working on "resurrecting" dead species.

Medical resuscitation 
Modern medicine can, in some cases, revive patients who "died" by some definitions of death.

Most advanced versions of such capabilities may include a method/system under development reported in 2019, 'BrainEx', that could partially revive (pig) brains hours after death (to the degree of brain circulation and cellular functions). It showed that "the process of cell death is a gradual, stepwise process and that some of those processes can be either postponed, preserved or even reversed". A similar organ perfusion system under development, 'OrganEx', can restore – i.e. on the cellular level – multiple vital (pig) organs one hour after death (during which the body had prolonged warm ischaemia). It could be used to preserve donor organs but may also be developed to be useful for revival in medical emergencies by buying "more time for doctors to treat people whose bodies were starved of oxygen, such as those who died from drowning or heart attacks".

There is research into what happens during and after death as well as how and to what extent patients could be revived by the use of science and technology. For example, one study showed that in the hours after humans die, "certain cells in the human brain are still active". However, it is thought that at least without any life-support-like systems, death is permanent and irreversible after several hours – not days – even in cases when revival was still possible shortly after death.

A 2010 study notes that physicians are determining death "test only for the permanent cessation of circulation and respiration because they know that irreversible cessation follows rapidly and inevitably once circulation no longer will restore itself spontaneously and will not be restored medically". Development of advanced live support measures "including cardiopulmonary resuscitation (CPR) and positive pressure ventilation (PPV)" brought the interdependence of cessation of brain function and loss of respiration and circulation and "the traditional definition of death into question" and further developments upend more "definitions of mortality".

Hypothetical speculations without existing technologies 
Russian cosmist Nikolai Fyodorovich Fyodorov advocated resurrection of the dead using scientific methods. Fedorov tried to plan specific actions for scientific research of the possibility of restoring life and making it infinite. His first project is connected with collecting and synthesizing decayed remains of dead based on "knowledge and control over all atoms and molecules of the world". The second method described by Fedorov is genetic-hereditary. The revival could be done successively in the ancestral line: sons and daughters restore their fathers and mothers, they in turn restore their parents and so on. This means restoring the ancestors using the hereditary information that they passed on to their children. Using this genetic method it is only possible to create a genetic twin of the dead person. It is necessary to give back the revived person his old mind, his personality. Fedorov speculates about the idea of "radial images" that may contain the personalities of the people and survive after death. Nevertheless, Fedorov noted that even if a soul is destroyed after death, Man will learn to restore it whole by mastering the forces of decay and fragmentation.

In his 1994 book The Physics of Immortality, American physicist Frank J. Tipler, an expert on the general theory of relativity,  presented his Omega Point Theory which outlines how a resurrection of the dead could take place at the end of the cosmos.  He posits that humans will evolve into robots which will turn the entire cosmos into a supercomputer which will, shortly before the Big Crunch, perform the resurrection within its cyberspace, reconstructing formerly dead humans (from information captured by the supercomputer from the past light cone of the cosmos) as avatars within its metaverse.

David Deutsch, British physicist and pioneer in the field of quantum computing, formerly agreed with Tipler's Omega Point cosmology and the idea of resurrecting deceased people with the help of quantum computers but he is critical of Tipler's theological views.

Italian physicist and computer scientist Giulio Prisco presented the idea of "quantum archaeology",  "reconstructing the life, thoughts, memories, and feelings of any person in the past, up to any desired level of detail, and thus resurrecting the original person via 'copying to the future'".

In their science fiction novel The Light of Other Days, Sir Arthur Clarke and Stephen Baxter imagine a future civilization resurrecting the dead of past ages by reaching into the past, through micro wormholes and with nanorobots, to download full snapshots of brain states and memories.

In religions 
Both the Church of Perpetual Life and the Terasem Movement consider themselves transreligions and advocate for the use of technology to indefinitely extend the human lifespan.

Zombies

A zombie (Haitian French:) is a fictional undead being created through the reanimation of a human corpse. Zombies are most commonly found in horror and fantasy genre works. The term comes from Haitian folklore, where a zombie is a dead body reanimated through various methods, most commonly magic.

Disappearances (as distinct from resurrection)

As knowledge of different religions has grown, so have claims of bodily disappearance of some religious and mythological figures. In ancient Greek religion, this was a way the gods made some physically immortal, including such figures as Cleitus, Ganymede, Menelaus, and Tithonus. After his death, Cycnus was changed into a swan and vanished. In his chapter on Romulus from Parallel Lives, Plutarch criticises the continuous belief in such disappearances, referring to the allegedly miraculous disappearance of the historical figures Romulus, Cleomedes of Astypalaea, and Croesus. In ancient times, Greek and Roman pagan similarities were explained by the early Christian writers, such as Justin Martyr, as the work of demons, with the intention of leading Christians astray.

In the Buddhist Epic of King Gesar, also spelled as Geser or Kesar, at the end, chants on a mountain top and his clothes fall empty to the ground. The body of the first Guru of the Sikhs, Guru Nanak Dev, is said to have disappeared and flowers left in place of his dead body.

Lord Raglan's Hero Pattern lists many religious figures whose bodies disappear, or have more than one sepulchre. B. Traven, author of The Treasure of the Sierra Madre, wrote that the Inca Virococha arrived at Cusco (in modern-day Peru) and the Pacific seacoast where he walked across the water and vanished. It has been thought that teachings regarding the purity and incorruptibility of the hero's human body are linked to this phenomenon. Perhaps, this is also to deter the practice of disturbing and collecting the hero's remains. They are safely protected if they have disappeared.

The first such case mentioned in the Bible is that of Enoch (son of Jared, great-grandfather of Noah, and father of Methuselah). Enoch is said to have lived a life where he "walked with God", after which "he was not, for God took him" (Genesis 5:1–18). In Deuteronomy (34:6) Moses is secretly buried. Elijah vanishes in a whirlwind 2 Kings (2:11). In the Synoptic Gospels, after hundreds of years these two earlier Biblical heroes suddenly reappear, and are reportedly seen walking with Jesus, then again vanish. In the Gospel of Luke, the last time Jesus is seen (24:51) he leaves his disciples by ascending into the sky. This ascension of Jesus was a “disappearance” of sorts as recorded by Luke but was after the physical resurrection occurring several days before.

See also
 1 Corinthians 15
 Information-theoretic death
 Metempsychosis
 Near death experience
 Necromancy
 Riverworld
 Suspended animation
 Undead

References

Further reading
 Alan J. Avery-Peck & Jacob Neusner (eds.). Judaism in Late Antiquity: Part Four: Death, Life-After-Death, Resurrection, and the World-To-Come in the Judaisms of Antiquity. Leiden: Brill, 2000.
 Caroline Walker Bynum. The Resurrection of the Body in Western Christianity, 200-1336. New York: Columbia University Press, 1996. 
 C.D. Elledge. Resurrection of the Dead in Early Judaism, 200 BCE -- CE 200. Oxford: Oxford University Press, 2017.
 Dag Øistein Endsjø. Greek Resurrection Beliefs and the Success of Christianity. New York: Palgrave Macmillan, 2009. 
 Mark T. Finney. Resurrection, Hell and the Afterlife: Body and Soul in Antiquity, Judaism and Early Christianity. New York: Routledge, 2017.
 Nikolai Fyodorovich Fyodorov. Philosophy of Physical Resurrection 1906.
 Edwin Hatch. Influence of Greek Ideas and Usages Upon the Christian Church (1888 Hibbert Lectures).
 Alfred J Hebert. Raised from the Dead: True Stories of 400 Resurrection Miracles.
 Dierk Lange. "The dying and the rising God in the New Year Festival of Ife", in: Lange, Ancient Kingdoms of West Africa, Dettelbach: Röll Vlg. 2004, pp. 343–376.
 Outi Lehtipuu. Debates over the Resurrection of the Dead: Constructing Early Christian Identity. Oxford: Oxford University Press, 2015.
 Richard Longenecker, editor. Life in the Face of Death: The Resurrection Message of the New Testament. Grand Rapids: Eerdmans, 1998.
Joseph McCabe. Myth of the Resurrection and Other Essays, Prometheus books: New York, 1993 [1925]
 Kevin J. Madigan & Jon D. Levenson. Resurrection: The Power of God for Christians and Jews. New Haven: Yale University Press, 2008.
 Tryggve Mettinger. The Riddle of Resurrection: "Dying and Rising Gods" in the Ancient Near East, Stockholm: Almqvist, 2001.
 Markus Mühling. Grundinformation Eschatologie. Systematische Theologie aus der Perspektive der Hoffnung. Göttingen: Vandenhoeck & Ruprecht, 2007.
 George Nickelsburg. Resurrection, Immortality, and Eternal Life in Intertestmental Judaism. Cambridge: Harvard University Press, 1972.
 Pheme Perkins. Resurrection: New Testament Witness and Contemporary Reflection. Garden City: Doubleday & Company, 1984.
 Simcha Paull Raphael. Jewish Views of the Afterlife. Lanham: Rowman & Littlefield, 2009.
 Erwin Rohde Psyche: The Cult of Souls and Belief in Immortality among the Greeks. New York: Harper & Row, 1925 [1921].
 Charles H. Talbert. "The Concept of Immortals in Mediterranean Antiquity", Journal of Biblical Literature, Volume 94, 1975, pp 419–436.
 Charles H. Talbert. "The Myth of a Descending-Ascending Redeemer in Mediterranean Antiquity", New Testament Studies, Volume 22, 1975/76, pp 418–440.
 
 N.T. Wright (2003). The Resurrection of the Son of God. London: SPCK; Minneapolis: Fortress Press.

External links

 Resurrection of Jesus Christ - Catholic Encyclopedia
 Article on resurrection in the Hebrew Bible.
 Jewish Encyclopedia: Resurrection
 The enticement of the Occult: Occultism examined by a scientist and Orthodox Priest
 Rethinking the resurrection.(of Jesus Christ)(Cover Story) Newsweek, April 8th 1996, Woodward, Kenneth L.
 Dictionary of the History of Ideas: Death and Immortality, Resurrection, Reincarnation

 
Afterlife
Miracles
Mythology
Religious belief and doctrine